Nolan Swancy (November 4, 1896 – July 14, 1964) was an American Negro league pitcher in the 1920s.

A native of Hubbard, Texas, Swancy played for the Indianapolis ABCs in 1924. He died in Waxahachie, Texas in 1964 at age 67.

References

External links
 and Seamheads

1896 births
1964 deaths
Indianapolis ABCs players
Baseball pitchers
Baseball players from Texas
People from Hubbard, Texas
20th-century African-American sportspeople